The ACB Finals Most Valuable Player Award is an award for the top-tier professional basketball league in Spain, the Spanish ACB League. The ACB first named a Finals Most Valuable Player after the 1990–91 ACB season. Since then, only three players have won the award more than once: Arvydas Sabonis (2 times), Juan Carlos Navarro (3 times), and Felipe Reyes (2 times). Historically, the MVP of the ACB Finals usually goes to the player on the winning team that has the highest Performance Index Rating stat over the course of the Finals series.

All-time award winners

The following is a list of the all-time ACB Finals Most Valuable Player Award winners.
Player nationalities by national team.

See also
ACB Most Valuable Player Award
All-ACB Team
ACB Rising Star Award

References

External links
Spanish League Official Website 

      
Liga ACB awards